Carl Krister Kristensson (25 July 1942 – 28 January 2023) was a Swedish footballer who played as a defender. He represented Malmö FF and Trelleborgs FF during a career that spanned between 1963 and 1981. A full international between 1967 and 1972, he won 38 caps for the Sweden national team and represented his country at the 1970 FIFA World Cup.

Club career 
Kristensson played most of his career for Malmö FF. He played 626 games for the club from 1963 to 1979. He won Allsvenskan seven times and Svenska Cupen five times. He was

International career 
Kristensson was capped 38 times for the Sweden national team, and was a part of the Sweden squad for the 1970 FIFA World Cup.

Post-playing career 
After his playing career Kristensson managed Trelleborgs FF (1979–1986), Lunds BK (1986–1987) and Höllvikens GIF (1989–1993) and was active as a board member of Malmö FF from 1995 to 2010. Outside of football Kristensson worked for 46 years, from the age of 16, for Swedish newspaper Sydsvenskan.

Personal life and death 
Kristensson had to amputate one of his lower legs in 2020, following infections related to a staircase accident in South Africa the previous year. 

Kristensson died on 28 January 2023, at the age of 80.

Career statistics

International

Honours 
Malmö FF

 Allsvenskan: 1965, 1967, 1970, 1971,  1974, 1975, 1977
 Svenska Cupen: 1967, 1972–73, 1973–74, 1974–75, 1977–78
 European Cup runner-up: 1978–79
 Bragdguldet: 1979

Individual

 Stor Grabb: 1969

Records

 Most appearances for Malmö FF: 626

References

External links

1942 births
2023 deaths
Swedish footballers
Footballers from Skåne County
Sweden international footballers
1970 FIFA World Cup players
Allsvenskan players
Malmö FF players
Trelleborgs FF players
Swedish football managers
Trelleborgs FF managers
Lunds BK managers
Association football defenders
Swedish amputees